Yasser Hashemi Rafsanjani (born 1971) is the youngest son of Akbar Hashemi Rafsanjani, the former president of Iran.

Biography
In 1989, he graduated from Nikan High School in Tehran, which was funded by a conservative religious group before Iran's revolution in order to provide the students, from elementary to high school, with a non-secular education.

In the same year, he entered University of Tehran to study civil engineering but later changed his major. He has also studied in Belgium.

Yaser owns a 30-acre horse farm in Lavasan (known as Iran's Beverly Hills) which in 2003 was estimated to be worth around US$120 million. He runs a large import-export firm which trades in industrial machinery, baby food, and bottled water.

References

1971 births
Living people
Akbar Hashemi Rafsanjani
Children of national leaders